Terschelling Frisian, or Skylgersk, is a West Frisian language spoken on the island of Terschelling (Skylge) in the Netherlands. In the central stretch of the island a dialect of Dutch (Midslands) is spoken, but on the western and eastern ends of the island are spoken two Frisian dialects, known simply as Westersk ('Western') and Aastersk ('Eastern'), by about 800 and 400 people, respectively.

West Frisian language
Terschelling